Homorthodes dubia is a species of cutworm or dart moth in the family Noctuidae. It was described by William Barnes and James Halliday McDunnough in 1912 and is found in North America.

The MONA or Hodges number for Homorthodes dubia is 10536.

References

 Crabo, L.; Davis, M.; Hammond, P.; Mustelin, T. & Shepard, J. (2013). "Five new species and three new subspecies of Erebidae and Noctuidae (Insecta, Lepidoptera) from Northwestern North America, with notes on Chytolita Grote (Erebidae) and Hydraecia Guenée (Noctuidae)". ZooKeys. 264: 85-123.
 Lafontaine, D.; Ferris, C. & Walsh, J. (2010). "A revision of the genus Hypotrix Guenee in North America with descriptions of four new species and a new genus (Lepidoptera, Noctuidae, Noctuinae, Eriopygini)". ZooKeys. 39: 225-253.
 Lafontaine, D. & Troubridge, J. (2010). "Two new species of the Euxoa westermanni species-group from Canada (Lepidoptera, Noctuidae, Noctuinae)". ZooKeys. 39: 255-262.
 Lafontaine, J. Donald & Schmidt, B. Christian (2010). "Annotated check list of the Noctuoidea (Insecta, Lepidoptera) of North America north of Mexico". ZooKeys. 40: 1-239.

Further reading

 Arnett, Ross H. (2000). American Insects: A Handbook of the Insects of America North of Mexico. CRC Press.

Eriopygini